Brett Delahunt  (born 20 February 1950) is a New Zealand professor emeritus of pathology and molecular medicine at the Wellington School of Medicine. He is an expert in urological pathology.

Early life and family
Born in Wellington on 20 February 1950, Delahunt was educated at Scots College. He studied at Victoria University of Wellington from 1969 to 1972, graduating BSc(Hons), and then at the University of Otago from 1973 to 1978, where he completed a BMedSc in 1976 and MB ChB in 1978.

In 1990, Delahunt married Sarah Anne Kirk.

Honours and awards

Officer of the New Zealand Order of Merit (ONZM) for services to pathology, 2004 Queen's Birthday Honours
Knight of the Order of St John, 1995
In 2018, he was awarded the Hercus Medal of the Royal Society of New Zealand as a result of his "internationally recognised contributions as a pathologist, especially in relation to kidney and prostate cancer."
Fellow Royal Society of New Zealand, 2012

References

1950 births
Living people
People from Wellington City
People educated at Scots College, Wellington
Victoria University of Wellington alumni
University of Otago alumni
New Zealand pathologists
Academic staff of the University of Otago
Fellows of the Royal Society of New Zealand
Knights of the Order of St John
Officers of the New Zealand Order of Merit